A recreation advocate is a community organizer who focuses their efforts on improving public recreation spaces such as parks and playgrounds.

History 
The role of recreation advocate is a philanthropic one that grew alongside the playground movement of the mid 19th century. Joseph Lee (1862-1937) is recognized as one of the early pioneers of recreation advocacy.

References 

Philanthropy in the United States
Community organizing
Community building
Community empowerment
Community and social services occupations